Papamoa or Papamoa Beach is a suburb of Tauranga, located about 11 kilometres from the city centre. It is the largest residential suburb in Tauranga. It is bordered to the west by Arataki and Mount Maunganui (east of Sunrise Avenue and Hibiscus Avenue), the east by the Kaituna River (separating it from the Western Bay of Plenty District) and to the south by State Highway 2.

History and culture

Māori settlement of Papamoa dates back to approximately 1400 CE with a significant pā complex overlooking the fertile plains and abundant coastal fisheries. For the next 300 years the people prospered, harvesting their crops and fisheries, occupying and abandoning sites in accordance with the kūmara cycle and soil fertility.

Papamoa has  of white sandy beach stretching from the boundary with Mount Maunganui in the west to the Kaituna River in the east. Widespread Pākehā settlement of the area did not start until the early 1960s and prior to this Papamoa had been largely a rural area. Once a small and tight knit community, many of Papamoa Beach's sweeping paddocks have been swallowed up by urban development.

In subsequent decades, Papamoa is currently one of the fastest growing suburbs of Tauranga, with many different subdivisions developing concurrently on different blocks of land on the fringes of the suburb. It is popular for fishing, surfing, and as a holiday retreat.

The local Mangatawa or Tamapahore Marae and its Tamapahore meeting house is a meeting place for the Ngāi Te Rangi hapū of Ngā Pōtiki.

Nudity 

Papamoa Beach is a clothing-optional beach by custom. New Zealand has no official nude beaches, as public nudity is legal on any beach where it is "known to occur". Sexual activity in public places is illegal, however, and Papamoa Beach has been the site of a continuing series of complaints about lewd behaviour. Some complainants take care to distinguish between these activities and non-sexual naturism; others do not.

In 2012, Papamoa Beach was the location for a skinny dipping world record attempt. On 2 December 2012, 299 people got naked in the water. Despite a cold day, many people stripped naked attempting to beat Christchurch's Summer Beach Dip. The record failed as Guinness World Records required all swimmers to be in the water at the same time for a group photo.

Name issues

The suburban area of "Papamoa" as it is commonly referred to today is actually situated at "Papamoa Beach." Strictly geographically speaking, "Papamoa" is actually located closer inland towards the Papamoa Hills, in an area covered by the Western Bay of Plenty District Council. Papamoa (situated at Papamoa Beach) can be split into two areas: Papamoa East and Papamoa West. Legally speaking, Domain Road separates Papamoa West from Papamoa East, although to many locals Papamoa East starts on the Eastern side of Parton Road. Papamoa East (of Parton Road) in the 1970s and 1980s used to be seen as more of an alternative place to live, a bit like the Coromandel Peninsula.

Demographics

Papamoa had a population of 25,272 at the 2018 New Zealand census, an increase of 5,928 people (30.6%) since the 2013 census, and an increase of 9,096 people (56.2%) since the 2006 census. There were 9,006 households, comprising 12,300 males and 12,972 females, giving a sex ratio of 0.95 males per female, with 5,805 people (23.0%) aged under 15 years, 3,963 (15.7%) aged 15 to 29, 11,232 (44.4%) aged 30 to 64, and 4,275 (16.9%) aged 65 or older.

Ethnicities were 85.3% European/Pākehā, 17.2% Māori, 2.8% Pacific peoples, 6.4% Asian, and 2.3% other ethnicities. People may identify with more than one ethnicity.

The percentage of people born overseas was 22.7, compared with 27.1% nationally.

Although some people chose not to answer the census's question about religious affiliation, 56.6% had no religion, 30.6% were Christian, 0.8% had Māori religious beliefs, 0.8% were Hindu, 0.3% were Muslim, 0.4% were Buddhist and 3.5% had other religions.

Of those at least 15 years old, 3,579 (18.4%) people had a bachelor's or higher degree, and 3,405 (17.5%) people had no formal qualifications. 3,408 people (17.5%) earned over $70,000 compared to 17.2% nationally. The employment status of those at least 15 was that 9,612 (49.4%) people were employed full-time, 2,892 (14.9%) were part-time, and 645 (3.3%) were unemployed.

Economy

Papamoa Beach has a large shopping area located to the west of Domain Road,. There is a small section of industrial activity located to the east of Parton Road.

Retail

Papamoa Plaza, a shopping centre covering 14,120 m², opened in 1997. It has 650 carparks and 39 shops, including Countdown and The Warehouse.

Fashion Island, another shopping centre covering 3,315 m², opened in 2006. It has 20 stores.

Education

The school originally took Year 1 to 8, but removed Year 7 and 8 when Papamoa College opened.

Suzanne Aubert Catholic School is a state integrated Catholic primary school which is due to open at the beginning of 2021.

Transport
Public transport in Papamoa Beach solely consists of bus services. The suburb is served by three 'Bay Hopper' routes; Route 30 (Mount Maunganui - Papamoa ), Route 33 (Tauranga - Papamoa via the Harbour Bridge), and Route 36 (Tauranga - Papamoa via Maungatapu Bridge).

Gallery

References

Suburbs of Tauranga
Nude beaches
Naturism in New Zealand